Vi to is a song by Danish singer Medina from her second studio album Velkommen til Medina. It was released as the fourth single from the album on 19 April 2010. The song was written by Medina, Rasmus Stabell and Jeppe Federspiel and was produced by Providers. "Vi to" peaked at number two in Denmark.

Track listing
 Danish digital download
 "Vi to" – 4:01

 Danish iTunes digital download EP
 "Vi To" (Svenstrup & Vendelboe Remix) – 4:41

Charts and certifications

Charts

Certifications

Release history

References

External links
 

2010 singles
Dance-pop songs
Medina (singer) songs
Songs written by Rasmus Stabell
Songs written by Jeppe Federspiel
2009 songs
EMI Records singles
Songs written by Medina (singer)